Kendall may refer to:

Places

Australia
Kendall, New South Wales

United States

Kendall, Florida
Kendall, Kansas
Kendall, Missouri
Kendall, New York
Kendall, Washington
Kendall, Lafayette County, Wisconsin
Kendall, Monroe County, Wisconsin
Kendall County, Illinois
Kendall County, Texas
Kendall Green, Pompano Beach, Florida
Kendall Grove, Virginia
Kendall Park, New Jersey
Boonville, California (formerly "Kendall's City")
Kendall Square, a neighborhood in Cambridge, Massachusetts
Kendall Township, Kendall County, Illinois
Kendall Township, Hamilton County, Kansas
Kendall Township, Kearny County, Kansas
Kendall West, Florida

Geographical features
Kendall Basin, an ice-free cirque in Antarctica
Kendall Island, an uninhabited arctic island in Canada
Kendall Mountain, a peak and ski area in Colorado
Kendall Peak, a mountain summit in Washington state
Kendall River, a small river in the Northwest Territories of Canada
Kendall Terrace, a volcanic ash terrace in the Shetland Islands of Great Britain

Schools
Kendall College of Art and Design, Grand Rapids, Michigan, USA
Kendall College, Chicago, Illinois, USA

People
Kendall (given name)
Kendall (surname)
Cynddelw Brydydd Mawr (in English "Kendall"), a 12th-century Welsh poet

Businesses
Kendall & Sons Ltd, umbrella manufacturer and ladies fashion retailer
Kendall Healthcare Products, an Irish healthcare provider that became Covidien after its acquisition by Tyco Healthcare

Other uses
The Kendalls, formerly a U.S. country music group
Kendall 32, a fiberglass cruising boat of the late 1960s
Kendall tau rank correlation coefficient, developed by Maurice Kendall

See also
Kendal (disambiguation)
Kendell (disambiguation)
Kendale Lakes, Florida